Euromed may refer to:

Euromed (train)
Barcelona Euro-Mediterranean Conference
Euro-Mediterranean Parliamentary Assembly

See also 

 EU Med Group